The British milk company Unigate produced a series of TV advertisements in the 1970s featuring characters called the Humphreys.  The Humphreys were milk thieves whose only visible presence was a red-and-white striped straw with which to suck up the milk.  TV personalities of the time, including Barbara Windsor, Arthur Mullard, Rod Hull and Spike Milligan, featured in the adverts; but the campaign is best known for the slogan: "Watch out, watch out—there's a Humphrey about!" written and sung by Mike Batt.

A merchandising campaign accompanied the adverts; and the Humphrey-themed mugs, milk bottles, and straws are now collectors' items.  The campaign was devised by John Webster of the Boase Massimi Pollitt advertising agency.

Celebrities featuring in the Humphrey ads
Muhammad Ali
Benny Hill
Rod Hull
Sid James
Henry McGee
Spike Milligan
Frank Muir
Arthur Mullard
Barbara Windsor

Several campaign stickers were produced, including: 
 "Watch Out, Watch Out, There's a Humphrey About", featuring two red-and-white striped straws projecting from a pocket
 "Watch Out for the Humphrey Patrol", featuring a row of the tops of thirteen red and white striped straws
 "Drink it Quick, Humphreys are Slick", featuring a red-and-white striped straw projecting from a partially drunk glass of milk.  

Three different full sticker sheets can be seen online.

References

External links
UK TV Commercials page featuring the lyrics to the Humphrey song.

Food advertising characters
Male characters in advertising
Fictional thieves
1970s in the United Kingdom
Dairy marketing